Reedy Marsh is a rural locality in the local government area (LGA) of Meander Valley in the Launceston LGA region of Tasmania. The 2016 census recorded a population of 185 for the state suburb of Reedy Marsh.

History 
Reedy Marsh was gazetted as a locality in 1968.

Geography
The Meander River forms a small part of the southern boundary.

Road infrastructure 
National Route 1 (Bass Highway) passes to the south. Access to the locality is provided by River Road.

References

Towns in Tasmania
Localities of Meander Valley Council